Vang Church may refer to:

Vang Church (Hamar), a church in Hamar municipality in Innlandet county, Norway
Vang Church (Vang), a church in Vang municipality in Innlandet county, Norway
Vang Evangelical Lutheran Church , a church in Wells County, North Dakota in the United States
Vang Stave Church, a church in Karpacz, Lower Silesia, Poland